Robert Venosawas born January 21, 1936, in New York City and died on August 9, 2011, in Boulder, Colorado, USA. He was an American Fantastic Realistic, Visionary painter who resided in Cadaques, Spain and Boulder, Colorado, USA. He studied with what are termed the New Masters. His artworks reside in collections around the world.

Life and works
Venosa first studied under the painter [[Mati Klarwein]] in New York. Later, he moved to Europe and studied
with one of the founders of the Vienna School of Fantastic Realism (German: Wiener Schule des Phantastischen Realismus), [[Ernst Fuchs (artist)]] in Vienna.

From these masters, he learned variations of a venerated painting technique developed in the mid-1400s, called the Mische Technique, which involves underpainting in water-soluble tempera with transparent oil paint glazes. While living in Vienna, Venosa met his second wife, the Austrian painter Jutta Venosa (born Cwik), with whom he had three children: Marcus,  Celene, and Christan. They moved to the coastal village of Cadaques, Spain, where he lived for fifteen years and befriended the surrealist painter Salvador Dalí. He later introduced H. R. Giger to Dalí.

Venosa traveled the globe with his partner and third wife, Martina Hoffmann, teaching their painting technique. The technique derived from what Venosa learned from his teachers, differing in the material used for the underpainting (casein versus egg tempera) but, largely, following the same processes.

Venosa died on August 9, 2011 having had cancer for eight years.

See also
Society for the Art of Imagination
Fantastic Realism School of art

Related museums galleries collections
Fantastic Art Centre
 Temporary Galerie in H.R. Giger Museum

References

Bibliography
 1978 - Robert Venosa: Manas Manna (Big "O" Publishing) 
 1991 - Robert Venosa: Noospheres (Pomegranate Communications Inc, US) 
 1999 - Robert Venosa: Illuminatus (with Terence McKenna, Ernst Fuchs, H. R. Giger, and Mati Klarwein) (Craftsman House) 
 2006 - True Visions (Erik Davis and Pablo Echaurren) (Betty Books) 
 2007 - Metamorphosis (beinArt)

External links

Talk

American contemporary artists
Psychedelic artists
Artists from Colorado
2011 deaths
1936 births
Deaths from cancer in Colorado
Visionary artists